Saint Patrick's Church is a Roman Catholic church located near St. Thomas Mount, in Chennai, India. From 1887, the church at the foot of St.Thomas Mount had been used as the Parish Church as it was convenient for the growing population.

This Church was actually built for the garrison in 1830 by Daniel O. L. Auig, the Vicar Apostolic of Madras. According to the records available the Parish of St. Thomas Mount was under San Thome till 1561 and it was made an independent Parish around 1575.

With the available records in 1791 Manoel de Virgem Maria had worked here in this Parish along with others succeeding him. In January 2008, John Bosco built a totally new and spacious Parish Church on the Roman model as the traditional Church was in a dilapidated condition. The Grotto of Our Lady is also modeled on that of Lourdes itself.

Shylock Stephen currently serves as the parish priest. This parish has more than 2000 Roman Catholic families.

History of Parish Priests

See also
 Religion in Chennai

References

External links
 St. Patrick's church

Churches in Chennai
Roman Catholic churches in Tamil Nadu